Bplats, Inc. is an application service provider (ASP) based in Tokyo, Japan. The company offers software as a service (SaaS) and platform as a service (PaaS) solutions. It runs web portals on ASP, SaaS and cloud computing and an online store to sell software and hardware, such as the VY Vocaloid series.

Services
The SaaS and PaaS services of the company include:

 SaaSplats: a SaaS consultancy and distribution network
 eCPlats: an electronic commerce platform
 RightsPlats: a business process outsourcing service to report music sales to JASRAC
 License-V: a business process management service to control licensing business

Products
Bplats sells the Vocaloid series VY planned and developed by Yamaha Corporation, along with related software and hardware.  The VY series of Vocaloids are different from other Vocaloids as their considered as having no form of avatar and were designed to be a high quality professional voicebank as well as to act as the intended standard for the Vocaloids products themselves.  Though each voicebank has a gender type voice (feminine, masculine) the Vocaloid series itself is void of such restrictions and are designed with the intention of allowing those using them to be able to manipulate the voice as they please.  The avatarless look was intended to encourage creativity with the series.  VY1, the first of the series, was released with a demo album containing songs by various producers from Nico Nico Douga and their interpretation of the Vocaloid along with the settings used for the song. Bplats focused on their high quality Vocaloids, even delaying VY2 for quality related issue; VY2 was created with the intention of being realistic and stable. Bplats is looking to produce male and female English Vocaloid products, with improvements to the standard of English used by the software, another Vocaloid is already under production.

Vocaloid 2 products

Released products

Vocaloid 3 products

Released products

Vocaloid 4 products

Released products

Vocaloid 5 products

Released products

References

External links
  
Bplats Vocaloid Store 
 
Vocaloid Music Publishing (rights management for creators) 
SaaSplats (SaaS distribution network) 
ASP-SaaS Navi (ASP and SaaS portal) 
Cloud News (cloud computing news portal) 

Software companies based in Tokyo
Vocaloid production companies
Software companies of Japan